The China Railways JF5 (解放5, Jiěfàng, "liberation") class steam locomotive was a class of 2-8-2 steam locomotives operated by the China Railway, originally built by Kawasaki in Japan in 1923 for the Jichang Railway.

History
In 1923, sixteen D50 class locomotives were exported to the Jichang Jidun Railway in Manchuria, which designated them class 500 and numbered 501 through 516. Ten were built by Kawasaki (works nos. 970−971, 1140−1170)  and six by Kisha Seizō (w/n 965−970), and though very similar to the Japanese D50 class, there were some slight differences in dimensions due to the larger loading gauge on Chinese lines.

After the establishment of Manchukuo, the Jichang Jidun Railway was nationalised along with other private railways to form the Manchukuo National Railway. These locomotives were classified by MNR to Mikana (シカナ) class, numbered 6540−6555, renumbered 501−516 in 1938.

Postwar
After the end of the Pacific War, these locomotives were passed on to the Republic of China Railway. After the establishment of the People's Republic of China, China Railways designated them ㄇㄎ5 (MK5) class in 1951, and subsequently 解放5 (JF5) class in 1959.

The last of these locomotives were retired in 1990.

References

2-8-2 locomotives
Kawasaki locomotives
Railway locomotives introduced in 1923
Steam locomotives of China
Standard gauge locomotives of China
Rolling stock of Manchukuo
Freight locomotives